Sparrowhawk (sometimes sparrow hawk) may refer to several species of small hawk in the genus Accipiter.  "Sparrow-hawk" or sparhawk originally referred to Accipiter nisus, now called "Eurasian" or "northern" sparrowhawk to distinguish it from other species. 

The American kestrel (Falco sparverius), a North American falcon species, is also commonly referred to as a "sparrow hawk". 

Hawk species include:

Accipiter
Birds by common name